A gyron is a triangular heraldic ordinary.
Gyron may also refer to:
de Havilland Gyron and de Havilland Gyron Junior, aircraft jet engines of the 1950s
Ford Gyron, experimental car produced in 1961